Tuxedo is an unincorporated community in Prince George's County, Maryland, United States.

History
Scattered settlement in Tuxedo appeared along the Baltimore and Potomac Railroad (later the Pennsylvania Railroad) by 1886, according to historic maps. In 1894, a local developer created the area as a railroad suburb of DC and named it Tuxedo, advertising it as "Washington's Prettiest Suburb", with its own train station. Despite aggressive sales, the settlement slowly developed along three blocks adjacent to the rail line. By 1917, the community contained approximately 20 houses, one church, and one school. Tuxedo grew to include two additional blocks and a total of approximately 50 residences and a new school by 1942.

The community is bounded on the north by the Town of Cheverly, on the south and east by the John Hanson Highway, and on the west by the B&O Railroad line. All of the census and demographic data for Tuxedo residents are included with the information for the Town of Cheverly.

Tuxedo has remained unincorporated, but shares services with the incorporated town of Cheverly, which was developed in the early 20th century. The second school constructed in Tuxedo was called the Cheverly-Tuxedo School and opened in 1923. This school and another facility in Cheverly remained in operation until 1991. Since that time, the Cheverly-Tuxedo School has functioned as a specialty education center. Another facility shared with Cheverly was the volunteer fire department. The Tuxedo-Cheverly Fire Station was constructed in 1930. This building has since been enlarged and is now operated by Prince George's County. Most of the land in and around Tuxedo has become industrial because of its proximity to the railroad line, the John Hanson Highway, and Baltimore–Washington Parkway.

Notable person
 The former Chief of the Metropolitan Police Department of the District of Columbia, Cathy Lanier, grew up in Tuxedo.

References

Unincorporated communities in Prince George's County, Maryland
Unincorporated communities in Maryland